Return to Yesterday is a 1940 British comedy-drama film directed by Robert Stevenson and starring Clive Brook and Anna Lee. It was based on Robert Morley's play Goodness, How Sad. The film was made at Ealing Studios.

Synopsis 
A British Hollywood star goes AWOL on his way back to Hollywood after a visit in London. The reason is an impromptu decision to leave the train on his way to the ocean liner in Southampton when it passes the seaside resort where he once worked as a struggling actor at a local theatre. Without anyone but his old landlady realising who he is, he then agrees to appear in latest production of a travelling repertory theatre company when it loses its leading man a few days before the premiere, and falls in love with the leading lady.

Cast

Critical reception
Allmovie called it "A delightful film that begs to be rediscovered."

References

External links

1940 films
1940 comedy-drama films
British comedy-drama films
1940s English-language films
Ealing Studios films
British black-and-white films
Films directed by Robert Stevenson
Films set in England
British films based on plays
1940s British films